CJQC-FM, branded as Queens County Community Radio is a Canadian radio station that broadcasts at 99.3 FM in Liverpool, Nova Scotia.

The station was officially launched on June 19, 2008 under a temporary special events licence. Its business plan was to operate throughout the summer of 2008 in order to gauge community support for the station and complete its formal application for a permanent licence.

On September 15, 2009, the station received CRTC approval for a full-time licence to operate at 99.3 MHz. The general manager at that time was the Canadian broadcaster Alex J. Walling.

In March 2011, Walling suffered a stroke, which led to the deterioration of the station's operations and the verge of bankruptcy. In June 2012, Walling sold the assets of the station to the CJQC Radio Society, a non-profit community organization.  In November 2012, the CJQC Radio Society applied for a new licence, for a station which operates at the same frequency of 99.3 MHz at the same parameters as the old licence. CRTC licensing was approved.

References

External links
Queens County Community Radio

JQC
JQC
Radio stations established in 2008
2008 establishments in Nova Scotia